Pit Boss is an American television series docudrama that follows Shorty Rossi, owner of Shorty's Rescue, an organization set up for Pit Bull rescue. The series aired on Animal Planet from January 16, 2010 to March 30, 2013.

Series overview
Shorty Rossi, a talent manager of Shortywood Productions, developed a passion for pit bulls when he was a teenager. Because of this, he created "Shorty's Rescue." Its main purpose: to rescue and rehabilitate pit bulls, the most misunderstood breed of dogs in the Greater Los Angeles area. Shorty enlisted the help of Sebastian, Ashley, and Ronald. Throughout the series, Shorty and his crew overcome many perils while carrying out their rescue efforts. Shorty's Rescue relies heavily on donations, so they host car washes, pet expos, etc., to raise money. In the season 6 finale, they return to discover that Shortywood's client roster has been destroyed by a rival talent agency.

Episodes

Season 1

Season 2

Season 3

Season 4

Season 5

Season 6

Former staff
Amanda – Fired at the end of "Little Chippendales" due to her dishonesty about being a dog person in her job interview.

Ronald (Returned) – Ronald quit Shorty's Rescue for acting classes, can be seen in the episode "So Long, Shorty". Returned after helping the team in a rescue when Amanda would not help. Ronald left briefly with Sebastian to pursue an acting career in the movie Mirror, Mirror. Months later, he returned to help in future rescues.

Sebastian (Returned) – During Season 4 when Sebastian needed $20,000 for medical expenses, he didn't want to ask Shorty for help so he started secretly working side jobs in his time off. However, when he booked a live event, the type of work usually booked through Shortywood, through a contact who was a former Shortywood client and Shorty found out, Shorty felt he could no longer trust Sebastian and fired him at the end of "The Betrayal." At the end of the "Crossroads" episode, Sebastian was rehired after the first few rescues on season 5 went from bad to worse.

Steven (Returned) – Resigned during the episode "Mending Fences". He has reappeared (rarely) in one or more episodes in season 6.

Ashley – Resigned (gives two week's notice) during the episode "Everybody's Changing" and she returns in "The End of Shortywood?".

Newer staff
Christan – Helping out the Shortywood Dog Rescue Kennel.  He is one of the newer volunteers.

External links

Animal Planet original programming
2010 American television series debuts
2013 American television series endings
2010s American reality television series
Television shows about dogs
Television shows set in Los Angeles